Anke Huber was the defending champion but lost in the first round to Denisa Chládková.

Ángeles Montolio won in the final 3–6, 6–3, 6–2 against Elena Bovina.

Seeds
A champion seed is indicated in bold text while text in italics indicates the round in which that seed was eliminated.

  Anke Huber (first round)
  Magdalena Maleeva (second round)
  Justine Henin (semifinals)
  Barbara Schett (second round)
  Magüi Serna (second round)
  Anne Kremer (second round)
  Silvija Talaja (first round)
  Tathiana Garbin (quarterfinals)

Draw

External links
 2001 Estoril Open draw

2001 Women's Singles
Singles
Estoril Open